Ržiše (in older sources also Režišče) is a settlement in the hills northeast of Izlake in the Municipality of Zagorje ob Savi in central Slovenia. The area is part of the traditional region of Lower Carniola. It is now included with the rest of the municipality in the Central Sava Statistical Region. It includes the hamlet of Gamberk.

References

External links
Ržiše on Geopedia

Populated places in the Municipality of Zagorje ob Savi